Tempête Football Club is a professional football club based in Saint-Marc, Haiti. The club was founded in 1970 and competes in Haiti's top league, Ligue Haïtienne.

They hold a fierce rivalry with local club Baltimore SC

History

Tempête Football Club was founded on July 5, 1970 at the Boulevard of Freedom in Saint-Marc, Haiti. The club took its name from a thunderstorm that occurred during an afternoon match between local players . Fitting with this theme, the club adopted the colors blue and white for their kit.

Tempête won their first national league championship in 1992 as well as the Super Coupe d'Haïti, defeating second division champion Don Bosco FC.
First President : Andre Laguerre 1970 – 1975

CONCACAF Champions League

After winning the national championship in 2010, Tempête FC was awarded one of three Caribbean spots in the preliminary round of the 2011–2012 CONCACAF Champions League, facing Monarcas Morelia of Mexico. The home match was to take place at Stade Sylvio Cator, but due to ongoing renovations following the 2010 Haiti earthquake both matches were played in Mexico.

Honours
Ligue Haïtienne: 5
1992, 2008 O, 2009 O, 2010 O, 2011 C

Super Coupe d'Haïti: 1
1992

Coupe d'Haïti: 5
1976, 1988, 1989, 2005, 2007

Super 8: 2
2007, 2012

Trophée des Champions d'Haïti: 3
2008, 2009, 2010

Coupe des Grandes Antilles: 1
2012

International competitions
CONCACAF Champions League: 3 appearances
1989 – First Round (Caribbean 1989) Lost against  RC Rivière-Pilote, 0–0 (6–5 pen)
1993 – Forfeit due to political sanctions against Haiti.
2011 – Preliminary round: Lost to  Monarcas Morelia 7–0 on aggregate (5–0 & 2–0)

CFU Club Championship: 3 appearances
2009 – Fourth place
2010 – Bye to second round; withdrew
2011 – Runners-up

Coupe des Grandes Antilles: 1 appearance
2012 – Champions

Crests

Players

Current squad

Coaches

 Jacques Michaud
 Eric Cadet
 Frantz Valcin (1992)
 Yves Elien (1976)
 Joseph Dénéus
 Wilfrid Jean-Baptiste
 Jean Michel Vaval
 Erns Nono Jean-Baptiste
 Raphael Delatour
 Witerson Odigé
 Alix Avin (1992–94)
 Makens Doriélan
 Conrad Destin
 Daniel Jean Charles
 Frantz Laguerre
 Pierre André Dorvilus
 Ronald Génescar
 Frantz Philippi
 Ronald Marseille
 Wilner Etienne
 Gérald Beauvais
 Miguel Saint-Jean
 Kenel Thomas
 John Sevère
 Garry Beauvil
 Jean Hubert Anglade
 Wilcuins Plaisir (2008–)
 Marc Ogé
 Danilo Barriga

References

External links
Official Website
footballzz.com

Football clubs in Haiti
1970 establishments in Haiti
Association football clubs established in 1970
Artibonite (department)